known as Lylat Wars in the PAL regions, is a 3D rail shooter video game developed by Nintendo for the Nintendo 64. It is the second installment in the Star Fox series and a reboot of the original Star Fox for the Super Nintendo Entertainment System.

Star Fox 64 was the first Nintendo 64 game to feature support for the system's Rumble Pak peripheral, which initially came bundled with retail copies of the game. Since its release in 1997, the game has sold over 4 million copies, making it the best-selling game in the series and the ninth best-selling game on the system. The game received critical acclaim for its precise controls, voice acting, multiplayer modes, and replayability through the use of branching gameplay paths. Like the SNES Star Fox game before it, Star Fox 64 has been deemed one of the greatest video games of all time. A stereoscopic 3D remake for the Nintendo 3DS, Star Fox 64 3D, was released in 2011, and a reimagining for the Wii U, Star Fox Zero, was released in 2016. The game was also re-released on the Nintendo Switch Online + Expansion Pack at the launch of the service on October 25, 2021.

Gameplay 
Star Fox 64 is a 3D rail shooter game in which the player controls one of the vehicles piloted by Fox McCloud, usually an Arwing. Most of the game takes place in "Corridor Mode", which forces Fox's vehicle down an on-rails path straight forward through the environment. In Corridor Mode, the player's vehicle can be maneuvered around the screen to dodge obstacles and can also perform a somersault to get behind enemies or dodge projectiles. The Arwing is also capable of deflecting enemy fire while performing a spinning maneuver called a "barrel roll" (actually an aileron roll in real-life aviation terms). The Arwing and Landmaster can charge up their laser cannons to unleash a powerful lock-on laser.

In addition to Corridor Mode, some stages of the game, including multiplayer and most boss fights, take place in "All-Range Mode". In this variant, the player can move freely in a three-dimensional space within the confines of a large arena. The Arwing can also perform one new maneuver in All-Range Mode: a U-Turn to change direction.

Throughout the game, the player can fly or drive through power-ups to collect them. These include silver and gold rings that refill the vehicle's shields, weapon upgrades, wing repairs, extra lives, and Nova bombs.

Returning from the original Star Fox are wingmen that fly with the player in their own Arwings. Fox's wingmen periodically attack enemies or are pursued into the player's field of view, requiring the player to shoot down the pursuers before the wingman has to retreat to the Great Fox mothership for repairs (the character will then be unavailable to start the next stage, but may return if enough time passes). Each wingman provides a different form of assistance to the player: Slippy Toad scans bosses and displays their shields on the player's screen, Peppy Hare provides gameplay advice, and Falco Lombardi occasionally locates alternate routes through stages. Some stages also feature special appearances from supporting characters that assist the team.

The game features a branching level system, in which more difficult paths are unlocked by completing certain objectives. Players can also change paths once the current mission is accomplished. All of the game's possible routes start at Corneria, eventually putting the player in contact with the Star Wolf Team, and end at Venom in a confrontation with Andross.

To add replay challenge, the game also features awardable medals, which are earned by accomplishing a mission with all wingmen intact and having achieved a certain hit total. Obtaining medals unlocks bonus features, such as new multiplayer vehicles, cosmetic changes to Fox in single player, and additional game settings such as "Expert Mode".

Vehicles

The Arwing is the primary fighter craft used by the Star Fox team. The player can use the fighter's boost meter to perform special techniques to avoid collisions, change direction, and gain tactical advantages in combat. Certain levels also put the player in a tank-like vehicle called the Landmaster, as well as a submarine named the Blue Marine on the planet Aquas. Each vehicle shares some tactical characteristics with the Arwing while providing its own unique gameplay elements.

Multiplayer
Star Fox 64 features split-screen multiplayer support for up to four players simultaneously. At first, users can only play using the Arwing fighter, but by earning certain medals in the main campaign, players can unlock the Landmaster tank and fight on foot as one of the four members of Star Fox equipped with a bazooka. Multiplayer is the only place where players can use a Landmaster with upgraded lasers.

There are three modes of multiplayer play: a "point match" in which the player must shoot down an opponent a certain number of times, a "battle royal" in which the last player left wins, and a "time trial" to destroy enemy fighters.

Plot 
On Corneria, the fourth planet of the Lylat system, Andross is driven to madness and nearly destroys the planet using biological weapons. General Pepper exiles Andross to the remote planet Venom. Five years later, Pepper detects suspicious activity on Venom. Pepper hires the Star Fox team (including James McCloud, Peppy Hare, and Pigma Dengar) to investigate. After Pigma betrays the team and Andross captures James, Peppy escapes from Venom and informs his son Fox about James's fate.

Two years later, Andross launches an attack across the Lylat system. Defending Corneria, Pepper summons the new Star Fox team, now consisting of Fox, Peppy, Falco, and Slippy. While traveling through several planets, the team battles with several of Andross' henchmen, including the rival mercenary team Star Wolf. After the team arrives at Venom, Fox confronts and defeats Andross alone, then returns with his teams to Corneria for a victory celebration. Pepper offers Fox the opportunity to join the Cornerian Army, but he declines and the team departs.

Two endings are available depending on how Fox approaches Venom and defeats Andross. The Easy route ending occurs when Fox arrives from Bolse and destroys a robotic version of Andross, leaving Andross himself drifting in the Lylat system. In the Hard route ending from Area 6, Fox reveals Andross' true form as that of a floating brain, and kills him. Shortly before his death, Andross activates his base's self-destruct system in a last-ditch attempt to kill Fox. However, his father James appears and guides Fox out of the exploding base before disappearing again.

In a post-credits scene, Pepper receives a bill from Star Fox presenting the number of enemies killed and multiplies it by 64, resulting in the amount of money due. If the price is between $50,000 and $69,999 (between 781 and 1,093 enemies killed) he will say, "This is one steep bill....but it's worth it". If the price is over $70,000 (1,094 or more), he says "What?!" At this point, the bill is stamped.

Main Characters
The Star Fox team is a group of mercenaries who are enlisted by General Pepper to defend the Lylat system. The team consists of:
 Fox McCloud: A red fox who took over leadership of the team after his father, James, was captured by Andross in a prior assault. Fox is the game's protagonist and only playable character in Story Mode.
 Peppy Hare: A rabbit who was part of the original Star Fox team. He survived and escaped when Pigma betrayed the team, which led to James's capture. He serves on the current Star Fox team as a mentor to Fox during missions.
 Falco Lombardi: A falcon who is an excellent fighter, but is also quite cocky and self-assured. He looks for alternate routes and shortcuts.
 Slippy Toad: A frog who is the team's mechanical expert. He is cheerful and energetic, but also prone to getting himself in trouble. He provides the player with valuable information about certain enemies and bosses.

Star Fox receives instructions and support from General Pepper, a bloodhound and leader of the Cornerian militia. The team's mothership, The Great Fox, is piloted by a robot named ROB 64 (NUS64 in the Japanese version). Two other supporting characters appear in certain missions to provide aid to the Star Fox team: Bill Grey, Fox's bulldog friend and leader of two fighter units; and Katt Monroe, Falco's friend and former gang member.

Andross is the game's primary antagonist who resembles a monkey or ape, although his species has never been officially confirmed. He is a mad scientist who is intent on capturing and controlling the Lylat system.

The Star Wolf team is a rival band of mercenaries recruited by Andross to attack Star Fox and stop their progress. This team consists of Wolf O'Donnell, a wolf and Fox's long-time rival; Leon Powalski, a sinister chameleon who targets Falco; Andrew Oikonny, Andross's nephew, who goes after Slippy; and Pigma Dengar, a pig who betrayed the original Star Fox team, leading to James's capture. Pigma taunts and chases his former teammate Peppy.

Development

Following the release of Star Fox in 1993, series creator Shigeru Miyamoto began working on Star Fox 2 for the Super Nintendo Entertainment System (SNES).  By 1995, Miyamoto and team had largely finished development of Star Fox 2 before realizing that its release would require the upgraded Super FX 2 chip, which would increase the cost of the game. Furthermore, newly launched competitor consoles, namely the Sega Saturn and the Sony PlayStation, possessed processing power and graphics capabilities that dwarfed those of the SNES, making Star Fox 2 appear obsolete. Recognizing this and that the Nintendo 64 would launch the following year with significantly increased processing power and graphical capabilities, Miyamoto made the decision to cancel Star Fox 2 in favor of developing a new Star Fox game for the Nintendo 64.

Following the cancellation of Star Fox 2, Miyamoto and team began work on Star Fox 64. The team cribbed heavily from the work that had been done in Star Fox and Star Fox 2, stating in an interview that roughly 30% of 64s gameplay came from the original game, roughly 60% came from the cancelled sequel, and the remaining 10% was original work done during development.  In particular, Miyamoto said: "All-Range Mode, Multi-Player Mode and the Star Wolf scenario all came from Star Fox 2". One new aspect of gameplay was the addition of levels that used the Landmaster tank and the Blue-Marine submarine, which were conceived of by members of the development team (rather than Miyamoto himself) in response to Miyamoto's suggestion that the game include a "human-type craft", which the team generally did not approve of. The team originally intended for the game to contain multiple underwater levels but ultimately scaled back as they found that the underwater levels slowed down the pacing of the game.

With the underlying gameplay largely complete early in development, Miyamoto and the team focused the majority of their efforts on graphics, audio and dialogue, and enemy AI, seeking to harness the Nintendo 64's processing power. For example, inspired by Miyamoto being a fan of the British puppet-based show Thunderbirds, the development team animated the game's characters opening and closing their mouths in a puppet-like fashion while speaking, which reduced the overall amount of animation work required for the game. The team also realized that adding dynamic audio would enhance the 3D gameplay experience as the player's allies could audibly signal when the player was being pursued by an offscreen enemy. In writing dialogue for the game's characters, the developers sought to invoke traditional historical dramas, adding more conventional lines such as "I've been waiting for you, Star Fox" and "You're becoming more like your father". Edgier dialogue such as "I guess it's your turn to be thankful" was written for the character Falco Lombardi, while more supportive dialogue such as "Never give up. Trust your instincts!" came from the character Peppy Hare.

Star Fox 64 was also the first title to make use of the Rumble Pak peripheral, which came bundled with the game in some instances. Miyamoto stated that the development team struggled to utilize the Rumble Pak in a way that players understood, noting that during development, players were often confused as to why their controller was vibrating.

Release 
The game was first shown publicly at E3 1996 where Nintendo released a video of an early version of the game. This early version of the game showcased only the first level (Corneria) and featured a minimalistic HUD, showing only a crude meter reflecting the player's shield gauge. Nintendo released further beta footage of the game on December 6, 1996, that showed subsequent levels, an improved HUD, and a short multiplayer segment.

As the game approached launch, Nintendo became concerned that the title "Star Fox" could be considered too similar to the name of the German company "StarVox". Thus like its predecessor, the game was rebranded as Lylat Wars in certain PAL territories. Nintendo Power subscribers received a promotional video prior to Star Fox 64s release (the same tactic was used to promote Donkey Kong Country for the SNES as well as Diddy Kong Racing, Banjo-Kazooie, and Hey You, Pikachu! for the Nintendo 64) that advertised the game's cinematic presentation, as well as new features like the Rumble Pak and voice acting. It revolves around two agents of Sega and Sony (who at the time were Nintendo's biggest hardware competitors) interrogating a Nintendo employee into revealing information about the game.

Years after release, a substantial number of unused assets were found on the cartridge including unused icons, audio files, levels, and power-ups. In an interview post-release, Miyamoto said that while he was not 100% satisfied with the final version of Star Fox 64, he felt that the game made better use of the Nintendo 64's increased processing power than Super Mario 64, which was a launch title for the console and which Miyamoto had also developed.

Reception 

Star Fox 64 received critical acclaim and was one of the top-selling games of 1997, second to Mario Kart 64. Reviews hailed the level branching system, particularly its use of player performance and secret in-level triggers rather than simple path selection. Many reviewers also praised the multiplayer modes as an ample source of replay value. However, Crispin Boyer of Electronic Gaming Monthly (EGM) considered them a waste, contending that the split screen display made targets too small to pinpoint. The game's voice clips were widely complimented, not for the quality of the acting, but for the unprecedented quantity of audio clips for a cartridge-based game. Critics also applauded the precise analog control, boss designs, Rumble Pak implementation, and cinematic cutscenes. GamePro gave the game a perfect 5 out of 5 in all four categories, praising the gameplay, graphics, controls, and fun factor.

The most common criticism was that Star Fox 64 was not as much of a leap over the original Star Fox as Super Mario 64 was over previous Mario games, in particular that the gameplay was still on rails. This perceived shortcoming did little to dull critics' response to the game, however. GameSpot reviewer Glenn Rubenstein declared Star Fox 64 "an instant classic" and "a pleasure to look at". EGM gave it their "Game of the Month" award, with Dan Hsu calling it "a shooting fan's dream come true" and Shawn Smith "almost as good as Mario 64". IGN reviewer Doug Perry said it "demonstrates that shooters are more alive now than ever".

The GameSpot review of the Wii Virtual Console version bestows a (7.6/10), praising its simple, enjoyable shooting gameplay, and much voice acting. The review says the game is nice to look at regardless of its graphic age, with added replay value in finding hidden paths, but found the lack of rumble support "alarming", especially since it is the first game to support the Rumble Pak.

In the first five days of the game's U.S. launch, more than 300,000 copies were sold, surpassing the record previously held by Mario Kart 64 and Super Mario 64. It sold above 1 million units in the United States by the end of 1997, one of five Nintendo 64 games to do so. Sales were considerably less in Japan, where it sold 75,595 copies during the first week of sale.  The game also took the #73 spot in Nintendo Power's "Top 200 Nintendo Games Ever".

Star Fox 64 is listed as the 45th greatest game of all time by Guinness World Records Gamer's Edition in 2009. In 1997 EGM ranked it the 39th best console video game of all time, citing its amazing visuals, huge amount of voice acting, and the deep challenge of earning medals on all stages and completing expert mode. They also named it "Shooter of the Year" at their 1997 Editors' Choice Awards. In 2009, Official Nintendo Magazine ranked the game 14th in a list of the greatest Nintendo games.

Remake 

At E3 2010, Nintendo announced a remake of Star Fox 64 for the Nintendo 3DS, titled Star Fox 64 3D. Nintendo exhibited a demo the same day that emphasized the technology of the Nintendo 3DS. The remake was co-developed by Q-Games and features stereoscopic 3D graphics, quality-of-life improvements, gyroscope controls, and  brand new voice recordings. The game was released on July 14 in Japan and September 9, 2011 in Europe and North America. This marked the first time that Star Fox 64 had been released in PAL territories under the original Star Fox name. While the remake supports multiplayer for up to four players via download play, the game does not have an online multiplayer mode.

Notes

References 

1997 video games
Cooperative video games
IQue games
Multiplayer and single-player video games
Nintendo 64 games
Nintendo Entertainment Analysis and Development games
Nintendo Switch Online games
Rail shooters
Shooter video games
64
Video game reboots
Video games developed in Japan
Video games about extraterrestrial life
Video games scored by Koji Kondo
Video games designed by Shigeru Miyamoto
Video games produced by Shigeru Miyamoto
Virtual Console games
Virtual Console games for Wii U
Video games with alternate endings